Mount Redifer is a mountain, 2,050 m, standing 3 nautical miles (6 km) south of Mount Ellsworth in the Queen Maud Mountains. Mapped by United States Geological Survey (USGS) from ground surveys and U.S. Navy air photos, 1960–64. Named by Advisory Committee on Antarctic Names (US-ACAN) for Howard D. Redifer, meteorology electronics technician at South Pole Station, 1959.
 

Mountains of the Ross Dependency
Amundsen Coast